Z Ursae Minoris (Z UMi) is a carbon star and R Coronae Borealis variable in the constellation Ursa Minor.

Z Ursae Minoris was discovered to be a variable star in 1934.  It was catalogued as a probable Mira variable, due to its red colour and variations over several hundred days.  It was discovered to be a carbon star in a survey published in 1985, and subsequently found also to be hydrogen-deficient.  After fading by almost six magnitudes in 1992, it was classified as an R Coronae Borealis variable.  It was confirmed as an R Coronae Borealis variable, one of the coolest in the class, after its spectrum was analysed in 2006.

References

Ursa Minor (constellation)
R Coronae Borealis variables
Ursae Minoris, Z
Carbon stars